The English cricket team toured the West Indies from 16 January to 8 April 1998 as part of the 1997–98 West Indies cricket season. The tour included six Tests and five One Day Internationals, with West Indies winning the Test series 3–1 and the ODI series 4–1. Originally five Tests were scheduled; however, the opening Test at Sabina Park was called off after 62 deliveries due to an unsafe pitch, and a sixth Test in Trinidad was hurriedly scheduled to take its place. This is the most recent six-match Test series in international cricket.

Squads

Test series – The Wisden Trophy

1st Test

2nd Test

3rd Test

4th Test

5th Test

6th Test

ODI series summary

West Indies won the Cable and Wireless Trophy 4-1.

1st ODI

2nd ODI

3rd ODI

4th ODI

5th ODI

References

External sources
CricketArchive
 Playfair Cricket Annual
 Wisden Cricketers Almanack (annual)

1998 in English cricket
1997
West Indian cricket seasons from 1970–71 to 1999–2000
International cricket competitions from 1997–98 to 2000
1998 in West Indian cricket